The 2017 CS Tallinn Trophy was a senior international figure skating competition, held in November 2017 at the Tondiraba Ice Hall in Tallinn, Estonia. Its senior categories were part of the 2017–18 ISU Challenger Series. Medals were awarded in the disciplines of men's singles, ladies' singles, pair skating, and ice dance.

Entries 
The International Skating Union published the full preliminary list of entries on 31 October 2017.

 Withdrew before starting orders were drawn
 Men: Paul Fentz (GER), Thomas Stoll (GER), Thomas Kennes (NED),  Mikhail Kolyada (RUS)
 Ladies: Pauline Wanner (FRA), Ivett Tóth (HUN), Niki Wories (NED), Anastasia Kononenko (UKR)
 Pairs: Liubov Efimenko / Matthew Penasse (FIN), Marissa Castelli / Mervin Tran (USA), Ioulia Chtchetinina / Mikhail Akulov (SUI)
 Ice dance: Adelina Galayavieva / Laurent Abecassis (FRA), Katjuscha Anna Alwart / Arturas Ganzela (LTU), Elena Ilinykh / Anton Shibnev (RUS), Robynne Tweedale / Joseph Buckland (UK)

Added
 Ice dance: Alisa Agafonova / Alper Uçar

Results

Men

Ladies

Pairs 
Alexandrovskaya/Windsor won their first senior-level international title.

Ice dance

References

Citations

External links 
 
 2017 CS Tallinn Trophy at the International Skating Union

Tallinn Trophy
CS Tallinn Trophy
2017 in Estonian sport